In enzymology, a [glutamate—ammonia-ligase] adenylyltransferase is an enzyme that catalyzes the chemical reaction

ATP + [L-glutamate:ammonia ligase (ADP-forming)]  diphosphate + adenylyl-[L-glutamate:ammonia ligase (ADP-forming)]

Thus, the two substrates of this enzyme are ATP and L-glutamate:ammonia ligase (ADP-forming), whereas its two products are diphosphate and adenylyl-[L-glutamate:ammonia ligase (ADP-forming)].

This enzyme belongs to the family of transferases, specifically those transferring phosphorus-containing nucleotide groups (nucleotidyltransferases).  The systematic name of this enzyme class is ATP:[L-glutamate:ammonia ligase (ADP-forming)] adenylyltransferase. Other names in common use include glutamine-synthetase adenylyltransferase, ATP:glutamine synthetase adenylyltransferase, and adenosine triphosphate:glutamine synthetase adenylyltransferase.

Structural studies
As of late 2007, only one structure has been solved for this class of enzymes, with the PDB accession code .

References

 
 
 
 
 
 

Glutamate-ammonia-ligase
Enzymes of known structure